The salmon catfish (Neoarius leptaspis), also known as the boofhead catfish, the freshwater forked tailed catfish, the lesser salmon catfish, and the triangular shield catfish, is a species of catfish in the family Ariidae. It was described by Pieter Bleeker in 1862, originally under the genus Hexanematichthys.

The diet of the salmon catfish includes insects, mollusks, prawns, finfish and aquatic plants. It is preyed upon by fish such as Scleropages jardinii and the Barramundi, and snakes in the species Acrochordus arafurae.

The salmon catfish breeds between September and January.

References

Ariidae
Fish described in 1862